Stefano "Nino" Garris (born 21 April 1979) is a German former professional basketball player.

He was born in West Germany to an Italian mother and an African American father.

Garris was capped for the German national team 72 times. His greatest success was third place at the 2002 Basketball World Cup in Indianapolis, United States.

His retirement was announced in 2012 due to injuries.

References

External links 
Basketball Bundesliga Profile
FIBA Profile
EuroLeague Profile

1979 births
Living people
Alba Berlin players
German men's basketball players
German people of African-American descent
German people of American descent
German sportspeople of Italian descent
Paderborn Baskets players
Sportspeople from Paderborn
Shooting guards
Skyliners Frankfurt players
Small forwards
2002 FIBA World Championship players